McKeel Hagerty, born December 9, 1967, is an American entrepreneur, business personality, he is the CEO of Hagerty, a specialty provider of classic car insurance headquartered in Traverse City, Michigan. He is a Co-Founder and General Partner at Grand Rapids, Michigan-based venture capital firm Grand Ventures. He was the global board chairman for the Young Presidents' Organization (YPO) from 2016 to 2017.

Early life
In 1983, Hagerty's parents, Frank and Louise Hagerty, started Hagerty Insurance Agency in Traverse City, Michigan with a focus on collector wooden boats. That same year, McKeel finished a three-year restoration of his first car with his father – a 1967 Porsche 911S. McKeel started the restoration at the age of 13 with $500 in lawn mowing money that he had saved.

By 18 years of age, Hagerty earned his insurance license and was selling marine craft policies.
He had not planned on going into the family insurance business, studying philosophy and Russian Orthodox theology in the seminary. Hagertyholds BA in English and Philosophy from Pepperdine University in 1990, MA in Theology from Saint Vladimir’s Orthodox Theological Seminary in 1993 and studied graduate work at Boston College in Philosophy and Classic until 1995.

In 1995, Hagerty returned to Traverse City to take over the company with his sister Kim, expanding the company’s focus beyond wooden boats and into classic and collector cars.

Career
In 1995, Hagerty led the company as its vice president. In 2000, Hagerty became the CEO of Hagerty Insurance Agency, and he was first among classic car insurers to embrace the internet for online quoting and policy management. That same year, he began serving as a judge at the Pebble Beach Concours d'Elegance for the Federation Internationale des Vehicles Anciens (FIVA) preservation class and was the youngest person ever to be asked to serve in such a role.

In an effort to preserve historic vehicles and related artifacts as a lasting record, Hagerty created the Historic Vehicle Association (HVA) in 2009, and in March 2013, the HVA entered into a collaboration with the U.S. Department of the Interior to develop the National Historic Vehicle Register.

Hagerty was presented with the Nicola Bulgari Award from America's Car Museum in 2014 for his outstanding contributions to preserving cars through education, restoration and collecting.

In 2016, Hagerty was elected to serve as global board chairman for Young Presidents' Organization (YPO) – the world’s largest CEO organization whose members run companies that employ 16 million people and generate $6 trillion in annual revenues. Hagerty co-founded venture capital firm Grand Ventures in 2017, and launched DriveShare by Hagerty, the nation's only peer-to-peer classic vehicle rental marketplace that same year.

In 2022, Hagerty appeared in the video game Gran Turismo 7 as himself, describing classic cars available for the player to purchase.

References 

Living people
1967 births
American chief executives